Latyrx is an American alternative hip hop duo consisting of Lateef the Truthspeaker and Lyrics Born. The roots of their partnership lay in the formation of the Solesides collective at the University of California, Davis.

History
The crew's charter members—which also included DJ Shadow and the future Blackalicious team—were all involved in student radio and shared a progressive-minded approach to hip-hop. Lateef and Lyrics Born initially recorded as solo artists; under the name Asia Born, the latter released the first single on the Solesides label, "Send Them," in early 1993.

The first proper Latyrx release came in 1996, and was actually the B-side of Lateef's solo single "The Wreckoning." For the track in question, also called "Latyrx," both MCs recorded completely different raps that were played back simultaneously. Coupled with DJ Shadow's production and its unique effect, it started to build an underground buzz for the duo. More solo sides followed that year—Lateef cut "The Quickening (The Wreckoning, Pt. II)" with DJ Shadow on the boards, and Lyrics Born produced his own 12" release, "Balcony Beach" b/w "Burnt Pride." Most of these solo sides, along with a raft of new material, appeared on the duo's debut LP, The Album, which was released in 1997.

DJ Shadow produced a total of four tracks, and Chief Xcel (later of Blackalicious) helmed two, while Lyrics Born handled the rest himself. The Album earned rave reviews for its adventurous, electronic-flavored production and the distinctive flows of both rappers. It was followed closely by the Muzapper's Mixes EP, which contained the boundary-pushing single "Lady Don't Tek No." Muzapper's Remixes appeared in 1998, but unfortunately, The Album didn't stay in print much longer; it was reissued briefly in 1999 before disappearing again. Meanwhile, Solesides was reconfigured into a new label, Quannum Projects, and the collective officially changed its name to Quannum as well. Latyrx did not record much following their brief reign as an underground sensation. They guested on "8 Point Agenda," a 1999 single by The Herbaliser, and also contributed new material to the Quannum Spectrum compilation that year.

Quannum Projects finally reissued The Album in 2002, allowing it to take its place alongside the new crop of independent hip hop that included El-P's Def Jux crew, Anti-Pop Consortium, and Anticon. Both Lateef and Lyrics Born went on to successful solo projects, the former with Blackalicious' Chief Xcel and Fatboy Slim. Lyrics Born released two successful solo albums on Quannum Projects, before signing in 2006 to Epitaph Records.

Lyrics Born announced on his website in February–March 2007 through a podcast that a new Latyrx album would see light after his next solo project. The album was finally released in 2013 and was entitled The Second Album. It was released on Latyramid Records to mixed reviews.

Discography
Albums
 The Album (1997)
 The Second Album (2013)

EPs
 The Muzapper Mixes EP (1997)
 Disconnection (2012)

Remix albums
 The Muzapper Mixes (1997)

Compilations
 Latyrical Madness Volume 1 (2012)

Live albums
 Latyrx: Live at Google (2012)

Singles
 "Lady Don't Tek No" (1997)

References

External links
 SoleSides site
 Official Quannum (formerly Solesides) site
 Official Lyrics Born site

Hip hop groups from California
Quannum Projects artists
Musical groups established in 1996
Musical groups from Davis, California
Hip hop duos
American musical duos
Alternative hip hop groups